Marie-Madeleine Mborantsuo  (born 18 April 1955) is a Gabonaise lawyer. She is the president of the Constitutional Court of Gabon (Cour Constitutionnelle de la Republique Gabonaise) since its foundation in 1991.

Personal life and education
Mborantsuo was born in Franceville on 18 June 1955. Her parents were Jean Dambangoye and  Berthe Nouo. She won a "Miss Franceville" beauty pageant, and became the lover of the then president Omar Bongo, with whom she had two children. She studied law at the National University of Gabon (later Omar Bongo University), then gained a Masters in Public Finance at University of Paris II and a doctorate in constitutional law in 2005 at the University of Aix-en-Provence. Her doctoral thesis title was Cours constitutionnelles africaines et État de droit.

Career
From 1983 to 1991 she was president of the Cour de Comptes of the Supreme Court of Gabon and taught law at Omar Bongo University. After taking part in the national conference of 1990 she was one of the writers of the country's new constitution, and became president of the newly-established constitutional court (the Constitutional Court of Gabon), a post she still holds .

It has been suggested that she "contributed to the Constitutional Court's loss of legitimacy as an impartial institution" by making controversial decisions on the allegedly fraudulent presidential elections of 1993, 2009 and 2016 in which her former lover and then her step-son Ali Bongo Ondimba retained and gained the post of president.

Selected publications
La contribution des Cours constitutionnelles à l'Etat de Droit en Afrique, (2007,) 
La Constitution de la République Gabonaise

References

1955 births
Living people
Gabonese lawyers
Gabonese women lawyers 
Omar Bongo University alumni
Academic staff of Omar Bongo University
Paris 2 Panthéon-Assas University alumni
Aix-Marseille University alumni
21st-century Gabonese people